() is the second studio album by Swedish singer Benjamin Ingrosso, released on 15 January 2021 by TEN Music Group. Ingrosso's first album in Swedish, he is credited as a co-producer on every song. Dealing with themes of love, friendship, and childhood, Ingrosso described the album as an homage to 1990s pop, with influences from Orup, Mauro Scocco, and Lisa Nilsson. In mid-2020, Ingrosso was a contestant on the Swedish music reality series ; two of his covers from the series are included on the track listing, including "", originally by Nilsson. The lyrics of "" were taken from a poem by Swedish writer Barbro Lindgren. "", written when Ingrosso was 12–13 years old, was released as a single on 11 January 2021.

The album debuted at number one on the Swedish national albums chart published by the Swedish Recording Industry Association.

Critical reception 

 received mixed reviews from domestic music critics. A reviewer for  noted the memorable lyrics and nostalgic sound but found the album lacked a common theme.  and Gaffa both highlighted Ingrosso's maturity in recording Swedish-language songs compared to his English-language debut in 2018, noting the more personal subject matter of their lyrics. A two-star review from  praised Ingrosso's songwriting but felt that the album's tracks were "safe", unexciting, and not memorable.

Track listing 
Credits adapted from Tidal.

Charts

Weekly charts

Year-end charts

Certifications

See also
 List of number-one singles and albums in Sweden

References

2021 albums
Benjamin Ingrosso albums
Pop albums by Swedish artists
Swedish-language albums
TEN Music Group albums